The International Conference on Theory and Practice of Electronic Governance (ICEGOV) is an annual conference concerning electronic governance coordinated by the United Nations University Operating Unit on Policy-Driven Electronic Governance (UNU-EGOV). ICEGOV first took place in Macau, China in 2007.

The conference promotes the interaction and cooperation between universities, research centres, governments, industries, and international organizations and aims to promote the sharing of knowledge through the publication and presentation of academic papers. From 2007 – 2018, ICEGOV received 2025 paper submissions, 1007 of which it has published, and has been attended by more than 6000 participants originating from 109 countries around the world.

Event history
Overview of each ICEGOV event:

Publications 
ICEGOV has produced several publications as a direct result of paper submissions to the conference. ICEGOV publications are indexed by Scopus, Web of Science, and DBLP – Computer Science Bibliography.

 11 conference proceedings volumes (ACM Press), comprising more than 1000 papers written by more than 1500 authors (74% from developing countries and 26% from developed countries);
 Special Collection of e-Government Innovations in India (ACM Press, 2017);
 Special issues of Government Information Quarterly (Elsevier) with selected best papers.

References

External links

 

Technology in society
Public administration
Open government